The intersection non-emptiness problem, also known as finite automaton intersection problem or the non-emptiness of intersection problem, is a PSPACE-complete decision problem from the field of automata theory.

Definitions 

A non-emptiness decision problem is defined as follows.  Given an automaton as input, the goal is to determine whether or not the automaton's language is non-empty.  In other words, the goal is to determine if there exists a string that is accepted by the automaton.

Non-emptiness problems have been studied in the field of automata theory for many years.  Several common non-emptiness problems have been shown to be complete for complexity classes ranging from Deterministic Logspace up to PSPACE.

The intersection non-emptiness decision problem is concerned with whether the intersection of given languages is non-empty.  In particular, the intersection non-emptiness problem is defined as follows.  Given a list of deterministic finite automata as input, the goal is to determine whether or not their associated regular languages have a non-empty intersection.  In other, the goal is to determine if there exists a string that is accepted by all of the automata in the list.

Algorithm 

There is a common exponential time algorithm that solves the intersection non-emptiness problem based on the Cartesian product construction introduced by Michael O. Rabin and Dana Scott.  The idea is that all of the automata together form a product automaton such that a string is accepted by all of the automata if and only if it is accepted by the product automaton.  Therefore, a breadth-first search (or depth-first search) within the product automaton's state diagram will determine whether there exists a path from the product start state to one of the product final states.  Whether or not such a path exists is equivalent to determining if any string is accepted by all of the automata in the list.

Note: The product automaton does not need to be fully constructed.  The automata together provide sufficient information so that transitions can be determined as needed.

Hardness 

The intersection non-emptiness problem was shown to be PSPACE-complete in a work by Dexter Kozen in 1977.  Since then, many additional hardness results have been shown.  Yet, it is still an open problem to determine whether any faster algorithms exist.

References 

* See an incomplete list of related publications here.

Related 

 Deterministic Finite Automaton
 Emptiness Problem
 PSPACE-complete
 List of PSPACE-complete Problems

PSPACE-complete problems
Automata (computation)